The 2020 Malaysia M3 League was supposed to be the 2nd season of Malaysia M3 League  the third-tier semi-professional football league in Malaysia since its establishment in 2019 before it was suspended and abandoned due to COVID-19.

The season started on 7 March and concluded on 17 November 2020.

On 13 March, it was announced that the league would be suspended indefinitely, due to the ongoing COVID-19 pandemic.

As a result of the COVID-19 pandemic, this season's competition was formally abandoned on 8 June 2020, with all results from the season being expunged, and no promotion or relegation taking place to, from, or within the competition.

Establishment and format
This new season saw the format restructuring by the AFL. On 19 January 2020, the AFL has announced the format changes for the Malaysia M3 League and Malaysia M4 League in preparation for the transition of the amateur team to semi-professionals by 2021.

The league will kick-off with 20 teams and to be split into 2 groups, an increase of 6 teams compared to 14 teams in the previous edition. The top 12 teams with a good financial record will remain in the 2021 Malaysia M3 League while the remaining 8 teams will advance to the Malaysia M4 League which will be formed with the 4 best teams 2020 Malaysia M4 League. AFL-recognized state and private leagues, originally part of the League The 2020 Malaysia M4 League will be part of the Malaysia M5 League in 2021.

Season Changes

Renamed clubs
 BTK F.C. was renamed to Kuala Terengganu Rovers F.C.
 Batu Dua F.C. was renamed to Harini F.C., and relocated to Kuala Selangor.
 Langkawi Glory United F.C. was renamed to Langkawi City F.C.
 Puchong Fuerza F.C. was renamed to Manjung City F.C., and relocated to Manjung.
 DDM FC was renamed to Melawati F.C.
 Tambun Tulang F.C. was renamed to Perlis United F.C.

To Malaysia M3 League
Promoted from 2019 Malaysia M4 League
 KSR SAINS - Promoted by winning the 2019 Malaysia M4 League play-offs
 IKRAM Muda - Promoted by runner up the 2019 Malaysia M4 League play-offs
 Immigration - Promoted by runner up the 2019 Kuala Lumpur League
 Thai Selangor - Promoted by winning the 2019 Puchong Community League
 Klasiko - Promoted by winning the 2019 Shah Amateur League 
 PIB - Promoted by winning the 2019 Shah Alam League 
 Perlis United - Promoted by winning the 2019 Perlis Amateur League
 Northern Lions-Mahsa - Promoted by runner up the 2019 Perlis Amateur League

Relegated from 2019 Malaysia Premier League
 Sarawak

New Team
 Semarak
 Kuala Lumpur Rovers
 Melaka City 1

From Malaysia M3 League
Promoted to 2020 Malaysia Premier League
 Kelantan United
 Kuching

Relegated to 2020 Malaysia M4 League
 Penjara
 Tun Razak

Team withdrawal
 Johor Bahru.
 SAMB 2

Notes:

   Melaka City fills the slot that SAMB FC left.
   SAMB FC withdrew from the M3 League this season and was replaced by Melaka City FC.

Clubs locations

<section end=map

Venues

Personnel and sponsoring

Coaching changes 
Note: Flags indicate national team as has been defined under FIFA eligibility rules. Players may hold more than one non-FIFA nationality.

Foreign players
Malaysia M3 League clubs can sign a maximum of four foreign players in the 2020 season, up from two as compared to 2019. However, two of them has to be 20 years old or younger on 1 January 2020.

Note: Flags indicate national team as has been defined under FIFA eligibility rules. Players may hold more than one non-FIFA nationality.

 Players name in bold indicates the player is registered during the mid-season transfer window.
  Foreign players who left their clubs or were de-registered from playing squad due to medical issues or other matters.

League table

Group A at the time of abandonment

Group B at the time of abandonment

Result table

Group A

Group B

Play-offs

Season statistics

Top scorers

Players sorted first by goals, then by last name.

Hat-tricks

Notes
4 Player scored 4 goals
5 Player scored 5 goals
(H) – Home team(A) – Away team

See also 
 2020 Malaysia Super League
 2020 Malaysia Premier League
 2020 Malaysia M4 League
 2020 Malaysia FA Cup
 2020 Malaysia Cup
 2020 Malaysia Challenge Cup
 2020 Piala Presiden
 2020 Piala Belia
 List of Malaysian football transfers 2020

References

External links
 Football Association of Malaysia website - M3 League

5
Malaysia M3 League seasons